Robert McDowell McCracken (March 15, 1874 – May 16, 1934) was a United States Representative from Idaho. McCracken served one term as a Republican in the House, from 1915 to 1917.

Born in Vincennes, Indiana, McCracken was elected in 1914 as one of two at-large members from Idaho, representing the entire state alongside Addison T. Smith. In 1916 he was defeated for reelection in the Republican primary by former congressman Burton L. French.

While campaigning for a return to Congress in 1934, McCracken died in an automobile accident near Emmett. His vehicle went through a guard rail and tumbled down Freezeout Hill.

McCracken, age 60, was buried at Blackfoot Cemetery in Blackfoot.

References

External links

Political Graveyard – Robert M. McCracken

1874 births
1934 deaths
People from Vincennes, Indiana
Republican Party members of the United States House of Representatives from Idaho
People from Bingham County, Idaho
People from Boise, Idaho
Road incident deaths in Idaho